The Itajaí-Açu Formation is a geological formation of the Santos Basin offshore of the Brazilian states of Rio de Janeiro, São Paulo, Paraná and Santa Catarina. The formation is a reservoir rock of the fields in the Santos Basin.

Etymology 
The formation is named after the Itajaí-Açu River, Santa Catarina.

Description 

Within this formation, the Ilhabela Member includes the turbiditic sandstones occurring along the section. The sedimentary environment is thought to be marine talus to open basin. Biostratigraphic data from palynomorphs, calcareous nanofossils and planktonic foraminifera indicate a Late Cretaceous age (Cenomanian-Maastrichtian).

Petroleum geology 
The formation, mainly its Ilhabela Member, is the main post-salt reservoir rock of the Santos Basin. The formation also is the main post-salt source rock and a seal for the post-salt reservoirs.

Fields with Itajaí-Açu reservoirs

See also 

 Campos Basin

References

Bibliography 
 
 
 
 
  

Geologic formations of Brazil
Santos Basin
Cretaceous Brazil
Upper Cretaceous Series of South America
Maastrichtian Stage of South America
Campanian Stage
Santonian Stage
Coniacian Stage
Turonian Stage
Cenomanian Stage
Shale formations
Sandstone formations
Deep marine deposits
Turbidite deposits
Seal rock formations
Reservoir rock formations
Source rock formations
Petroleum in Brazil
Formations
Formations
Formations
Formations
Tupi–Guarani languages